Anastasiia Maksimovna Salos (born 18 February 2002) is an individual rhythmic gymnast representing Belarus. She is the 2020 European Championships All-around bronze medalist, as well as the 2019 World Championships Team bronze medalist and 2019 European Championships Team silver medalist.

Career

Junior 
Salos began rhythmic gymnastics at the age of 4 in her hometown of Barnaul, Russia. Her parents wanted to find an activity in which she could burn off her excess energy, so her mother took her to a gymnastics class. In 2014 she moved to Belarus to join the national team there. She started appearing in international competitions in 2016, competing at the Tart Cup where she won gold in the team event and placed second in the junior all-around. In 2017 Salos competed at the Alina Cup (held with Grand Prix Moscow) where she won bronze in the junior all-around. She then competed at the International Tournament Deriugina Cup, winning the junior all-around and qualifying to all 4 apparatus finals. She also won silver in the junior all-around at the 2017 Aeon Cup.

Senior 
In 2018, Salos made her senior debut at the 2018 LA Lights competition. She then went on to win silver in the International Tournament Moscow. On March 30–April 1 Salos competed at her first senior World Cup event at 2018 World Cup Sofia, placing 5th in the all-around and qualifying to all 4 apparatus finals. Her next World Cup event was 2018 World Cup Pesaro, where she won bronze with ball. She first won her all-around medal at 2018 World Cup Baku, winning bronze behind Maria Sergeeva and Vlada Nikolchenko. Salos also won bronze at the 2018 World Challenge Cup Guadalajara with ball, and at the 2018 World Challenge Cup Minsk she won silver with ball and bronze with clubs. At the 2018 Rhythmic Gymnastics World Championships she placed 10th in the all-around and qualified to the ribbon final, where she placed 5th.

Salos began her 2019 season competing at the 2019 LA Lights competition, finishing 5th in the all-around. Her next competition was 2019 Grand Prix Moscow, where she placed 5th in the all-around and won bronze with ribbon. On March 2–3 she competed at the 2019 Grand Prix Marbella, where she won the bronze medal in the all-around behind Dina Averina and Aleksandra Soldatova. She qualified to all 4 apparatus finals, placing 4th with the ribbon, 5th with the clubs, 6th with the ball, and 8th with the hoop. Salos went on to win the all-around gold medal at the 2019 Deriugina Cup International Tournament, finishing ahead of Olena Diachenko and Maria Sergeeva. She also won gold with the ball and ribbon, and silver with hoop and clubs. At the 2019 Grand Prix Thias she finished 9th in the all-around and qualified for 2 apparatus finals, placing 4th with hoop and clubs. Her first World Cup event was at the 2019 World Cup Sofia, where she finished 10th in the all-around and placed 5th at the ribbon final. On April 16–18 Salos took part in the 2019 European Championships, where she won the silver medal in the team event (with Katsiaryna Halkina, Alina Harnasko, and Junior group) and qualified for 3 apparatus finals. During the apparatus finals she finished 4th with ribbon and 5th with hoop and clubs. Competing at the 2019 Grand Prix Holon she won her first all-around Grand Prix all-around gold medal, where she also won gold with ball, silver with ribbon, and bronze with clubs.

In 2021, Salos began her season at the Sofia World Cup at the end of March, where she placed fourth behind her compatriot Alina Harnasko overall, and in the finals, she earned silver in rim and ribbon and fifth place. in ball. In the next cup, at the Tashkent World Cup, where she obtained the complete bronze behind the Russian Arina Averina, the bronze in the hoop final, fifth place in the ball final and fourth in the ribbon final. At the Pesaro World Cup in late May, she placed fifth behind Israel's Linoy Ashram, and in the finals she was fourth in hoop and ball and eighth in ribbon. From June 9-13, Salos competed in the European Rhythmic Gymnastics Championships in Varna, Bulgaria, where in the general final, she obtained fifth place behind Israel's Linoy Ashram, and in the apparatus finals, she obtained bronze in the hoop. and clubs, seventh place in ribbon and eighth place in ball. At the beginning of July, she competed in the Minsk World Cup, where she obtained bronze in the general classification behind Russia's Lala Kramarenko, and in the finals by apparatus, she obtained silver in rim and ribbon, bronze in ball and fifth place in clubs. Two weeks later, the last competition before the Olympic Games, he competed in the Tel Aviv Grand Prix, where he obtained bronze in the general classification and in the finals he obtained silver in the ring, bronze in ball and clubs and ribbon. From August 6-8, Salos competed in the Tokyo 2020 Olympic Games. On the first day, he made it to the finals of the top 10 singles after finishing fifth behind compatriot Alina Harnasko. On the second day, the day of the grand final, various impressions left Salos in eighth place behind Israel's Nicol Zelikman.

Routine music information

Detailed Olympic results

Competitive highlights
(Team competitions in seniors are held only at the World Championships, Europeans and other Continental Games.)

References

External links 
 
 
 
 

2001 births
Living people
Belarusian rhythmic gymnasts
Medalists at the Rhythmic Gymnastics World Championships
Medalists at the Rhythmic Gymnastics European Championships
Gymnasts at the 2020 Summer Olympics
Olympic gymnasts of Belarus
People from Barnaul
Russian emigrants to Belarus